The 2001 Men's NORCECA Volleyball Championship was the 17th edition of the Men's Continental Volleyball Tournament, played by seven countries from September 21 to September 29, 2001 in Bridgetown, Barbados.

Competing nations

Squads

Preliminary round

Group A

Friday 2001-09-21

Saturday 2001-09-22

Sunday 2001-09-23

Group B

Friday 2001-09-21

Saturday 2001-09-22

Sunday 2001-09-23

Second round
Monday 2001-09-24
Quarterfinals

Final round

Tuesday 2001-09-25
Fifth Place Match

Semi-finals

Wednesday 2001-09-26
Bronze Medal Match

Gold Medal Match

Final ranking

Cuba, United States and Canada qualified for the 2002 FIVB Men's World Championship in Argentina

Individual awards

Most Valuable Player
  Ángel Dennis

Best Scorer
  Sebastien Ruette

Best Spiker
  Elvis Contreras

Best Blocker
  Steve Brinkman

Best Server
  Ángel Dennis

Best Digger
  Ihosvany Chambers

Best Setter
  Alain Roca

Best Receiver
  Richard Lambourne

References
 Results

Men's NORCECA Volleyball Championship
N
N
Volleyball